Cemetery Station No. 2 was a railway station on Sydney's Rookwood Cemetery railway line.  It served the Rookwood Cemetery.

History

The station opened as Roman Catholic Platform on 31 December 1901.  The name was changed to Cemetery Station No. 2 on 15 June 1908. The station was closed on 29 December 1948.

References

Statistics for sidebar
 Distance from Central railway station: 18.397 km

Neighbouring stations

Disused railway stations in Sydney